Bridget Armstrong (born 1937, Dunedin) is a New Zealand actress. She appeared on stage, film and TV several times, including The Lost Tribe (The Goodies); as Nurse Rosemary Layton, in the Edgar Wallace Mysteries ' episode, We Shall See; and, as Anna Bosworth, and Janet Davis, respectively, in The Scales of Justice episodes, 'The Undesirable Neighbour' and 'Infamous Conduct'. She also played Dian De Momerie in the BBC adaptation of Murder Must Advertise, by Dorothy L Sayers.

She was married to New Zealand writer Maurice Shadbolt from 1978 until his death in 2004.

References

External links
IMDB entry
Art New Zealand article

New Zealand actresses
Actors from Dunedin
1937 births
Living people